The following is a list of places located within the London Borough of Enfield

Arnos Grove
Botany Bay
Bowes Park (also partly in the London Borough of Haringey)
Brimsdown
Bulls Cross
Bush Hill Park
Clay Hill
Cockfosters (also partly in the London Borough of Barnet)
Crews Hill
Edmonton 
Enfield Chase
Enfield Highway
Enfield Island Village
Enfield Lock
Enfield Town
Enfield Wash
Forty Hill
Freezywater
Grange Park
Hadley Wood
New Southgate (also partly in the London Borough of Barnet)
Oakwood
Palmers Green
Ponders End
Southgate
Winchmore Hill
World's End

Lists of places in London